is a Japanese retired football player.

Saruta made 10 appearances in the J2 League with Ehime FC during 2006.

Club statistics

Honours
Bangkok Glass
Singapore Cup Winner (1): 2010
Thai FA Cup Runner-up (1): 2013
Queen's Cup Winner (1): 2010
Thai Super Cup Runner-up (1): 2009

References

External links

1982 births
Living people
Takushoku University alumni
Association football people from Hiroshima Prefecture
Japanese footballers
J2 League players
Japan Football League players
Ehime FC players
Kataller Toyama players
Japanese expatriate footballers
Japanese expatriate sportspeople in Thailand
Expatriate footballers in Thailand
Hironori Saruta
Hironori Saruta
Association football forwards